Yitzhak Gruenbaum (1879–1970) was a noted leader of the Zionist movement among Polish Jewry in the interwar period and of the Yishuv in Mandatory Palestine. Gruenbaum was the first Interior Minister of the State of Israel.

Biography
Yitzhak ("Itche") Gruenbaum was born in Warsaw, Poland. While a student of jurisprudence, he began activities on behalf of the Zionist movement and engaged in journalism. He served as editor of several periodicals widely circulated among Polish Jewry, including the Hebrew Ha-Zefirah and the Hebrew weekly Ha-Olam. Under his editorship, the Yiddish daily, Haynt, took on a pro-Zionist slant.

In Poland, Gruenbaum headed the Radical Zionist faction, initially known in Poland as Al Hamishmar. In 1919 he was elected to the Sejm (Polish parliament), where, together with Apolinary Hartglas, he organized a "Jewish bloc" that united most of the Jewish parties. He was the moving force in forming a collaboration with other minority parties represented in the Sejm, including Germans, Ukrainians, and others, to form a Bloc of National Minorities alliance in 1922, that acted to represent the rights of minority populations in Poland. His efforts brought about an increase of Jewish representation in the Sejm, which was accompanied by a rise of the political Zionism. Gruenbaum was known for his courageous and militant stance against his opponents and on behalf of minorities' interests, while equally critical of the ultra-orthodox party Agudat Israel and Jewish lobbying.

After moving to Paris in 1932, Gruenbaum immigrated to Mandatory Palestine in 1933 after being elected to the Jewish Agency Executive (the board of directors), during the Eighteenth Congress of the Zionist Organization.

Zionist activism

During the Holocaust, he served on the "Committee of Four" chosen at the outbreak of World War II to maintain contact with Polish Jewry and aid in their rescue. In 1942, when word reached the Yishuv of the mass extermination by the German occupying forces taking place in Eastern Europe, Gruenbaum was chosen to head a 12-member Rescue Committee comprising representatives of the various parties. Due to circumstances prevailing at the time, their rescue efforts failed to accomplish much.

At the war's end, he endured a personal crisis involving his son, Eliezer Gruenbaum. The latter, a Holocaust survivor, was accused in Paris by two other Holocaust survivors of having served as a Kapo and acting with cruelty towards Jewish prisoners. During his son's detention and trial, Gruenbaum remained at his side.  When the case closed, Eliezer immigrated to Palestine but continued to be attacked by right-wing and religious groups eager to discredit his father. Not long afterwards, Eliezer was killed in the 1948 Arab-Israeli War.

In 1946, Gruenbaum was among the Jewish Agency directors arrested by the British and interned in a detention camp at Latrun.

He spent his later years on Kibbutz Gan Shmuel, and died in 1970.

Political career

Gruenbaum was among a group of 13 leaders forming the provisional government of the emerging State, and, as a member of Provisional State Council (Moetzet HaAm), signed its declaration of independence. Between 1948 and 1949 he served as a member of the Provisional State Council and was the first Minister of the Interior in that formative period. His initial stance was with the General Zionists, but as time went on moved leftward. He became an adherent of the Mapam socialist-Zionist party, and was known as a declared secularist. Gruenbaum headed an independent list in the elections for the first Knesset, but failed to obtain the minimum number of votes to secure a seat.

He was later a candidate for President in the 1952 presidential election alongside Yitzhak Ben-Zvi of Mapai, Peretz Bernstein of the General Zionists and Mordechai Nurock of Mizrachi. However, he was  beaten by Ben-Zvi.

Journalism and literary career
He served as editor of the Hebrew Ha-Zefirah, the Hebrew weekly Ha-Olam and the Yiddish daily, Haynt.
 
Gruenbaum was the editor of the Encyclopedia of Diaspora Communities, The Zionist Movement and its Development and many other books.

Commemoration
Alonei Yitzhak, an Israeli youth village near Binyamina in northern Israel, is named for him.

References

Further reading
 Encyclopaedia Judaica, vol. 7, pp. 943–944.
 The Central Zionist Archives in Jerusalem site. Office of Yitzhak Gruenbaum (S46), personal papers (A127)

External links

Politicians from Warsaw
People from Warsaw Governorate
Jews from the Russian Empire
Signatories of the Israeli Declaration of Independence
Leaders of political parties in Israel
Polish emigrants to Mandatory Palestine
Members of the Legislative Sejm of the Second Polish Republic
Members of the Sejm of the Second Polish Republic (1922–1927)
Members of the Sejm of the Second Polish Republic (1928–1930)
Members of the Sejm of the Second Polish Republic (1930–1935)
Jewish socialists
Jewish Polish politicians
1879 births
1970 deaths
Yiddish-language journalists
General Zionists politicians
Mapam politicians
Jewish Agency for Israel
Heads of the Jewish Agency for Israel
Ministers of Internal Affairs of Israel
Candidates for President of Israel